Instructional capital is a term used in educational administration after the 1960s, to reflect capital resulting from investment in producing learning materials.

Education finance
Capital (economics)